The Made World Tour (stylized as MADE World Tour) was the second worldwide concert tour and ninth overall by South Korean boy band Big Bang, in support of their third Korean-language studio album Made (2016). The tour began on April 25, 2015, and concluded on March 6, 2016, in Seoul, South Korea. It visited 15 countries including China, Japan, Australia, Mexico, and the United States.

Background
The tour was first announced on April 1, 2015, with the announcement of the first two concerts in Seoul on April 25 and 26. On April 16, the first trailer of the tour was released on YouTube. On April 27, the remainder of the Asian leg was revealed with a total of 30 shows. In July, nine shows were confirmed in Mexico, Australia, Canada, Taiwan and Macau. It was the first time for the group to visit Mexico, Australia, Canada and Macau.

It was also revealed a highly acclaimed crew would be joining the tour, including LeRoy Bennett, Ed Burke, Gil Smith II, and Jonathan Lia. They previously worked with Beyoncé and Jay-Z on their On The Run Tour as well as with BigBang during their Alive Galaxy Tour.

Reception

Commercial 
In Asia, following the announcement of the tour, the first shows in Seoul sold out in a matter of minutes, resulting in server crashes due to high traffic. In Mainland China, BigBang gathered a record-breaking 280,000 people in attendance from 13 shows, making the tour the most attended concert tour by a foreign act of all time in China, with three sold-out shows in Shanghai making BigBang the only Korean act to hold three concerts in a row at Mercedes-Benz Arena and sold-out show in Chengdu, as BigBang held the largest audience drew by a Korean act for a single concert in China with 30,000 attending the show. Further sold-out shows in Guangzhou, Beijing, Dalian and Wuhan. In Hong Kong all three shows sold out in less than two hours after they went on sale, making BigBang the first non-Chinese singer to sell out three concerts in Hong Kong on two separate occasions The Macau two nights sold out within 3 hours leading to a third show being added, making them the first ever foreign artist group to hold three consecutive shows at The Venetian Macao, attracting over 28,598 fans with gross $5.3 million, and ranked the group at number 41 on the Top 100 International Boxoffice Grosses of the year at Pollstars year end list. In Singapore, demand was so high that "audio seats" were put on sale after regular tickets quickly sold out. In Malaysia, hundreds of fans lined up in advance to purchase tickets for the July 25 concert, which eventually sold out in a matter of hours. Due to high demand, a second show was added on July 24, making them the first Korean act to hold a two-day concert in Kuala Lumpur. in Japan BigBang became the first foreign artist holding a dome tour for the third consecutive year, the tour sold out and 4 new shows added in Tokyo Dome and Fukuoka Dome due to high demand. the tour that drew 911,000 fans in Japan making it the most attended concert tour by a foreign act of all time in the country. In Australia, a second show was added in Sydney after high demand, the tour became the highest-grossing and most-attended tour by Korean artists in the country. with $5.8 million from 35,000 tickets sold in 3 shows. In North America, the tour became the most attended tour by Korean act as it was listed on Pollstars year end list, on the Top 200 North American Tours, BigBang ranked at number 126 and earned $7.8 million from four reported shows. in Mexico they performed their most-attended concert outside Asia with 15,000 tickets sold at Mexico City Arena. In Canada they performed Infront of 14,000 fans making it the attended concert by a Korean act of all time in the counrty. In the United States the tour became the most attended concert tour by a Korean act of all time at the time. BigBang ended the tour with three encore shows in Seoul selling 38,000 tickets within 10 minutes. Total 1,500,000 fans attended the tour, making it the biggest tour made by Korean act.

 Critical 

The tour received universal acclaim from music critics. Jon Caramanica from The New York Times called BigBang the "Smooth K-Pop Criminals" and described the concert as an "extreme, intense, overwhelming Korean pop carnival", listing it as one of the best tours in 2015. Bryan Armen Graham of The Guardian gave the Newark concert four out of five stars and begin his review by saying BigBang deliver fully realised pop at its sophisticated peak, describing it as "K-pop heroes delivering candyfloss hooks with a sharp edge" while praising all five members' individual talents. The Los Angeles Times described BigBang as "One of the most inventive, aesthetically visionary acts in its genre" and called their Anaheim concert an "incredibly significant moment for K-Pop", praising the diversity of their songs and performances. Grantland's Rembert Browne remarked that BigBang is "a boy band that in reality is a supergroup", praising each member's musical idiosyncrasies, saying "It's terrifying how good each member is". Billboard gave the concert a 4.5/5, calling BigBang "five individuals that are separately complex, but together an undeniable supergroup" and stating how the group are still redefining what a boy band is today, and how they shine as a collective and on an individual, human basis. Writing for The Michigan Daily, Allen Donne said BigBang "is one of those musical entities that transcends language", a rare group that "both innovates and defines the direction a genre takes" and described the concert as an "electric, out-of-body experience" as well saying he was "lucky enough to witness this larger-than-life Korean pop group".

Other reviews from the tour included Maria Sherman writing for The Village Voice. Sherman described the show as unique and "unlike anything in the western pop schema" saying that the concert "served to reflect the rainbow spectrum of human emotion". Julianne Shepherd of the Jezebel described the concert as "the true definition of a spectacular" and stated they "have never seen a group nail being a boy band the way Big Bang did, playing up each member's individual strengths and personalities but also flawless when it came time to come together as a unit". David Lee from the Vibe called BigBang the "Kings of K-Pop" and praised their solo performances as the most interesting moments of the night, and naming the solo stages of the members as the one of the most interesting moments of the night, praising the group solo diversity from giving nightclub vibes with Seungri, Daesung's feel-good rock anthem, T.O.P's rebellion stage, Taeyang's ballad hit to G-Dragon ending it with pop song, and described it as an "amazing thing to witness". Gwendolyn Ng writing for The Straits Times opened the review with "Big Bang brings on the party with fancy moves, solid vocals and off-the-wall humour", and the live performance was "explosive" and stated that "Their solid vocals powered them through emotive ballads, high octane dance tunes and fiery rapping". Cassandra Monjo from the AU review ended her positive review by saying "A fantastic concert by a fantastic group of talented individuals! From the lighting to the musical direction, everything about this show was exactly what I'd expect from Bigbang: top quality". Siau Ming En from Today Online wrote on their review that the megastars BigBang "wowed the Singapore crowd with not just their powerhouse moves on stage but also their seasoned and cheeky banter. Melanie Leung of the South China Morning Post began her article stating concert as the "Hong Kong’s most anticipated show of the year", praising "Their sleek costumes stood out against the blasting fireworks, and every dance move was slick as they delivered a string of hits".

Live Stream
On December 2, 2014 YG Entertainment held a press conference in Hong Kong to announce a partnership with Tencent's QQ Music, the largest online music service in Mainland China. On June 20, 2015, during a joint press conference, YG Entertainment and Tencent announced the latter would exclusively live stream BigBang's concert in Shanghai the following night through Tencent's live concert streaming service, Live Music. On October 25, Tencent's Live Music held a second livestream for the concert in Macau which saw more than 120,000 paid viewers online, hitting a new domestic record for the number of paid online viewers.

The final concert in Seoul was aired live via Tencent's Live Music in Mainland China and Naver's V App internationally, with a total of six separate live-streams: five following each member and one showing the entire group. On the V app, the concert recorded 3.62 million views (total views from six different live-streams).

Set list

Tour dates

 Cancelled shows 

Box office score data

 Personnel 
Credits adapted from the 2016 Bigbang World Tour [Made] Final In Seoul DVD.Creative directors LeRoy A. Bennett
 Ed BurkeVideo content Jonathan Lia – Producer
 Ed Burke – Creative direction
 Dikayl Rimmasch – DirectorBand BigBang (G-Dragon, T.O.P, Taeyang, Daesung, Seungri) – Lead vocals
 Gil Smith II – Music director/Keyboard 1
 Adrian Porter – Pro Tools Programmer
 Omar Dominick – AMD/Bass
 Bennie Rodgers II – Drums/Percussions
 Justin Lyons – Guitar
 Dante Jackson – Keyboard 2DancersHi-Tec
 Park Jung Heon
 Kim Byoung Gon
 Kwon Young Deuk
 Kwon Young Don
 Lee Young Sang
 Lee Han Sol

Crazy
 Won Ah Yeon
 Park Eun Young
 Kim Min Jung
 Kim Hee Yun
 Choi Hye Jin
 Oh Hye RyeonShow'
 Lee Jae Wook – Choreographer
 Chris Grant – Co-choreographer
 Jeung Chi Young – Concert director
 Gee Eun – Visual director/stylist
 Kim Tae Hyun – Hair stylist
 Lim Hea Kyung – Make-up artist
 Hwangssabu – Personal trainer

Gallery

References

External links
Official Site
YG Entertainment
Big Bang Japan Official Site

2015 concert tours
2016 concert tours
BigBang (South Korean band) concert tours
Concert tours of North America
Concert tours of the United States
Concert tours of Canada
Concert tours of Mexico
Concert tours of Oceania
Concert tours of Australia
Concert tours of Asia
Concert tours of Japan